The Karlskoga Church is a wooden church building in Karlskoga, Sweden. Belonging to the Church of Sweden, the church was inaugurated in the 1600s. It is the oldest church in Karlskoga.

History 

On July 1, 1586, Charles IX of Sweden issued a letter for the first priest elected, Olaus Gestricius – also Olavus Johannis, Olof Hansson and «herr Olaf på Möckelnsbodar» – (by the late 1500s) where he addressed the need for a church by Lake Möckeln. The residents were ordered to erect the church and completed it at the beginning of the 1600s. It lacked pews, and the attendees had to stand upright during church service. The need for a church building is partly explained by a period of population growth in nearby areas due to a booming mining industry and Forest Finns settling the area.

From 1705 to 1706, the church was rebuilt and got its current size.

The church was renovated in 1972–1973, and in 2015–2016.

Donations 
The church's altarpiece was donated by Gerhard Ysing in 1686, chandeliers by both Anton af Geijerstam and Gerhard Ysing, and a pulpit by Johan Camitz in 1774.

Kristina Lovisa von Hofsten (née Geijer), also known as "Stornåda" donated a grandfather clock to the church in the 1700s.

Present day 
Karlskoga Church is an active parish church in the parish of Karlskoga, and the diocese of Karlstad. It arranges services on Sundays, baptisms, weddings and funerals.

References

Citations

Works cited

External links 

 

17th-century Church of Sweden church buildings
Buildings and structures in Karlskoga Municipality
Wooden churches in Sweden